Ashwood School may refer to:
Ashwood High School, public high school in Ashwood, Victoria
Ashwood School, Melbourne, specialist school in Ashwood, Victoria
Ashwood School, Virginia, historic school building in Hot Springs, Virginia